Wales is a historic house and site in Dinwiddie County, Virginia.  It was built in 1730 by Captain Howell Briggs of the Virginia Militia on a tract of land a few miles west of Petersburg, Virginia, in what was then Prince George County. Dinwiddie County was formed from Prince George in 1752.  Briggs is said to have named his plantation "Wales" after the Prince of Wales.

Wales was listed on the National Register of Historic Places in 1974.

The main house is a five-part Palladian architecture composition and is a Virginia Historic Landmark.

References

External links

 Wales, U.S. Route 460 vicinity, Petersburg, Petersburg, VA at the Historic American Buildings Survey (HABS)

Houses on the National Register of Historic Places in Virginia
Houses completed in 1730
Houses in Dinwiddie County, Virginia
Palladian architecture
National Register of Historic Places in Dinwiddie County, Virginia
Historic American Buildings Survey in Virginia